The Leicester balloon riot took place at Leicester's Victoria Park on 11 July 1864.  It occurred at a test flight of a new hydrogen balloon by aeronaut Henry Tracey Coxwell, for which 50,000 spectators attended.  The crowd were enraged by rumours that the balloon was not the largest and newest of Coxwell's balloons and because a woman was allegedly struck by a police officer.  Coxwell's balloon was damaged, upon which he caused the gas envelope to collapse and fled, under attack from the crowd.  The balloon was subsequently torn to pieces and its basket burnt.  The event caused considerable expense to Coxwell who had to build a replacement balloon and set back progress in scientific high-level flights.

Background 

Henry Tracey Coxwell was an English aeronaut of the mid to late 19th-century. He became famous for a 5 September 1862 flight with meteorologist James Glaisher. With low oxygen levels and temperatures below  the pair almost died before Coxwell managed to release gas from a valve with his teeth (his hands being unusable) to lose height. The flight, which was funded by the British Association for the Advancement of Science, provided valuable data about the earth's atmosphere and Coxwell and Glaisher resolved to continue high altitude flights.

Following the Wolverhampton flight and a subsequent flight on 29 September, Coxwell determined that his balloon's gas envelope was too worn to carry out further flights.  He constructed a new envelope which he named Britannia. It was capable of holding  of gas; a volume increase of 10%.  The new balloon required low altitude flights for testing and to make the envelope gas-tight so Coxwell carried out a series of demonstration flights in June at Crystal Palace and Derby.  Coxwell planned a further flight on 11 July 1864 from the racecourse at Victoria Park, Leicester during a fete organised by the Foresters Friendly Society.  Tickets were sold and 13 passengers, including two women, were scheduled to accompany Coxwell on his flight.

Riot 
The fete was attended by 50,000 people and was lightly policed (Coxwell later claimed there were only eight policemen on duty).  The flight was to take place at 5.30pm from a  field.  The field was enclosed by a fence but there was only an insubstantial barrier surrounding the balloon.  Early in the afternoon there was a disturbance when a gentleman, claiming to be an aeronaut, announced that Britannia was not Coxwell's newest and biggest balloon but an older model.  This enraged the crowd who, shortly after 2pm, broke down the barrier and demanded that Coxwell take off immediately.

At around this time Coxwell's passengers forced their way into the balloon basket against his instructions in such a manner that prevented him from taking off.  The carpenters necessary to remove the scaffold from around the balloon were also not available.  One of the passengers then announced to the crowd that Coxwell was refusing to ascend and this, combined with his bad language and gestures, enraged them. It is said that the police, who numbered only five in the immediate vicinity of the balloon, then struck a female member of the crowd on the forehead.  She fell to the ground bleeding which is said to have caused further anger in the crowd.

A member of the crowd threw a bottle which damaged the balloon envelope and others tore the mesh enclosing it.  Coxwell threatened that unless order was restored and the crowd moved back he would let the gas out of the balloon.  There was no response to this, aside from verbal abuse, and Coxwell followed through on his threat.  After the envelope collapsed the crowd surged forwards and tore it to pieces.  The police, led by Inspector Haynes and Sergeant Chapman, attempted to hold back the crowd but could do little more than attempt to protect Coxwell.  Coxwell was attacked, amid shouts of  "rip him up", "knock him on the head" and "finish him", and his clothes were torn.  One man who attempted to protect him was knocked to the ground three times.  Coxwell eventually found refuge at the house of the town clerk, Mr Stone, who lived nearby.

Britannia was destroyed and the balloon car, used for all of Coxwell's earlier ascents (including his famous high altitude trip with Glaisher) was burnt. The metal hoop, which supported the envelope, was paraded through the streets of Leicester by the mob.  One woman suffered injuries during the riot and was taken to hospital with a suspected broken back.

Aftermath 

Coxwell laid the blame for the riot with the Leicester City Police, who he said had failed to provide a sufficient number of officers.  He also stated that some of the mob wore the distinctive badge of the Foresters Society, apportioning some blame to them.  The London Review of Politics, Society, Literature, Art and Science described the crowd as  "a horde of savages as fierce and untamed as South Sea Islanders and differing very little from them except in their habitat, which was at Leicester" and the local residents were for some time known as "Balloonatics" due to their association with the riot.  However, Leicester residents laid the blame on agitators from other cities such as Nottingham.  The riot served as a demonstration of the ad hoc nature of early ballooning events and the lack of control aeronauts had over them.

The destruction of Britannia curtailed the number of high-altitude flights that the BA's balloon committee had planned to make in 1864.  Glaisher noted that he "deeply regretted that a wanton mob destroyed [Coxwell's] property and that events should have followed leading me to stop the experiments in which I was engaged".  Coxwell soon afterwards returned to low level flights using his old balloon and, on 29 August, made such a flight from Crystal Palace with Glaisher.  He constructed a new balloon, Research, even larger than Britannia had been, which flew in 1865.

The new balloon was a considerable expense to Coxwell.  He applied to the Foresters Society for a grant to cover his costs but their rules required a period of delay before he could be paid.  The Mayor of Leicester, keen to restore the city's standing, led a campaign for public subscriptions to cover the costs.  This raised some £500, of which £386 came from one individual – a Mr E. S. Ellis.

The riot marked the beginning of the end for Coxwell's association with Glaisher.  Glaisher was associated with the London branch of the Foresters Society and supported Coxwell's application for funding.  However, there was later a disagreement – Glaisher claimed Coxwell had behaved "impertinently" towards him over the matter.  Indeed, one of Glaisher's allies described the Research, as  "ill-gotten property" due to the "way in which [Coxwell] obtained the money from Leicester".

References 

1864 riots
1864 in England
Balloons (aeronautics)
History of Leicester
July 1864 events
Riots and civil disorder in England